The Westpark Tollway, also Fort Bend Westpark Tollway, is a limited-access toll road in Texas, serving western Houston and Harris County, and northeastern Fort Bend County. Construction on the facility began in 2001 and portions of the road were opened to traffic in May 2004. Construction of the roadway was completed in August 2005. It runs roughly parallel and to the south of Westheimer Road (FM 1093) in Harris County and concurrently with FM 1093 in Fort Bend County.

The Harris County Toll Road Authority (HCTRA) and the Fort Bend County Toll Road Authority (FBCTRA) operate the Westpark Tollway jointly. The  HCTRA section is simply named Westpark Tollway; however, the 8-mile (12 km) section of the toll road operated by the FBCTRA is named Fort Bend Westpark Tollway.

There are three major interchanges in between: the Southwest Freeway (I-69)/(US 59), the West Sam Houston Tollway (Beltway 8), and Grand Parkway (State Highway 99), along with several minor interchanges. The namesake of the tollway is Westpark Drive—an east–west major arterial running through a mostly industrial area.  Like other toll roads in the Houston area, the speed limit is —even inside Beltway 8.

The Westpark Tollway is the first fully electronic toll road in the United States. There are no tollbooths or toll collectors along either section of the route.  The only way to legally drive on the road is by using a transponder unit attached to a vehicle's windshield (either HCTRA's EZ TAG, NTTA's TollTag, TxTAG, PikePass from Oklahoma Turnpike Authority, or K-Tag from Kansas Turnpike Authority).  These transponders communicate with overhead sensors to deduct tolls from the user's toll account.

Fort Bend County Section
The Fort Bend section ties into the HCTRA portion of the tollway and is operated by the Fort Bend County Toll Road Authority (FBCTRA), under the alias of the Fort Bend Westpark Tollway. The project, completed on August 10, 2005, improves auto mobility for residents in northeastern Fort Bend County by creating a new east–west corridor with access to State Highway 6, Sam Houston Tollway (Beltway 8), I-69/US 59, and the Uptown District of Houston.

The Fort Bend section of the Westpark Tollway is patrolled by Fort Bend County Constable, Precinct 4. Additional coverage is provided by the Fort Bend County Sheriff's Department or other agencies as needed.

Future Segments
Parallel to the Fort Bend Westpark Tollway, FM 1093 has been widened by Texas Department of Transportation (TxDOT) to four lanes. FM 1093 at this location serves as a toll-free frontage road for the tollway.  The Fort Bend Westpark Tollway will add an additional four lanes to this effort—resulting in an eight-lane road. TxDOT is funding construction of the tollway interchanges at State Highway 99 and FM 1464.

Additionally, a 2012 expansion plan shows a Westpark Tollway addition to the city of Fulshear, Texas. The expansion promises a connection with the future Fulshear Parkway, and additional direct connection flyovers with SH-99.  Construction of phase one to extend Westpark Tollway from the Grand Parkway to just west of Spring Green Boulevard began in February 2016 and was finished in November 2017.  From 2017 to 2020, FM 1093 was expanded from two to four lanes from the Grand Parkway to James Lane near Fulshear; the highway will serve as frontage roads for future extensions of the Westpark Tollway.

Harris County Section
The Harris County portion of the tollway right-of-way was acquired by HCTRA from METRO, which had previously purchased the entire railroad right-of-way from Southern Pacific in 1992.

The Westpark corridor has a storied history as a transportation possibility. Originally on the books in the 1950s as the location of what is now Interstate 69/U.S. Highway 59 (Southwest Freeway) before developers lured it south to serve Sharpstown, the Westpark corridor has seen several transportation plans. The first time a toll road was mentioned was in a 1979 survey of several routes by the Texas Turnpike Authority, leading to the construction of the Hardy Toll Road in Northern Harris County by HCTRA. A heavy rail line along the corridor was floated in the 1980s, but failed to win voter approval, along with a monorail that was ended with Mayor Kathy Whitmire in 1991. Another commuter rail idea ended as METRO purchased the corridor and planned to run trains, but reversed itself and floated plans for a reversible high occupancy vehicle and bus transit lane to supplement the Southwest Freeway, tearing out the tracks in the mid 1990s. In 1999, HCTRA and METRO reached an agreement for half of the  right-of-way to go towards a toll road run by HCTRA and the other half for use by METRO for light rail.  Whether or not it will be the main corridor for the University Line is a contentious issue - Richmond Avenue, to the north, emerged as another option under consideration, along with the fact that Westpark Drive and its corresponding railroad right-of-way do not intersect METRORail at any point, much less Wheeler Station, which was chosen as the junction between the lines. As of 2006, a final corridor has not been chosen. As of 2014, a combination of Westpark and Richmond has been chosen as the University Line (METRORail), but the city has not allocated money for the project.

Exit list

External links

Fort Bend County Toll Road Authority
Harris County Toll Road Authority

Transportation in Fort Bend County, Texas
Freeways in Houston
Toll roads in Texas
Transportation in Harris County, Texas
County roads in Fort Bend County, Texas
County roads in Harris County, Texas